Tomás Mac Giolla (born Thomas Gill; 25 January 1924 – 4 February 2010) was an Irish Workers' Party politician who served as Lord Mayor of Dublin from 1993 to 1994, Leader of the Workers' Party from 1962 to 1988 and President of Sinn Féin from 1962 to 1970. He served as a Teachta Dála (TD) for the Dublin West constituency from 1982 to 1992.

Early life
He was born Thomas Gill in Nenagh, County Tipperary. His uncle T. P. Gill was a Member of Parliament (MP) and member of the Irish Parliamentary Party of Charles Stewart Parnell. Tomás's father Robert Paul Gill, an engineer and architect, also stood unsuccessfully for election on a number of occasions. His mother was Mary Hourigan.

Mac Giolla was educated at the local national school in Nenagh before completing his secondary education at St. Flannan's College, Ennis, County Clare. It was while at St. Flannan's that he changed to using the Irish language version of his name. He won a scholarship to University College Dublin where he qualified with a Bachelor of Arts degree, followed by a degree in Commerce.

A qualified Accountant, Mac Giolla was employed by the Irish Electricity Supply Board (ESB) from 1947 until he went into full-time politics in 1977.

In his early life Mac Giolla was an active republican. He joined Sinn Féin and the Irish Republican Army (IRA) around 1950. He was interned by the Government of Ireland during the 1956–62 IRA Border Campaign. He also served a number of prison sentences in Mountjoy Prison, Dublin.

He married May Mac Giolla who died on 24 March 2018.

Political career

At the 1961 general election, Mac Giolla unsuccessfully contested the Tipperary North constituency for Sinn Féin.

In 1962, he became President of Sinn Féin, and was one of the people who moved the party to the left during the 1960s. In 1970, Sinn Féin split and Mac Giolla remained leader of Official Sinn Féin. It was also in 1962 that Tomás married May McLoughlin who was also an active member of Sinn Féin as well as Cumann na mBan, the women's section of the IRA.

In 1969 he attended and spoke at a march in opposition to the Vietnam War in Dublin.

In 1977, the party changed its name to Sinn Féin the Workers Party and in 1982 it became simply the Workers' Party.

Mac Giolla was elected to Dublin City Council representing the Ballyfermot local electoral area in 1979 and at every subsequent local election until he retired from the council in 1997. In the November 1982 general election Mac Giolla was elected to Dáil Éireann for his party. In 1988, he stepped down as party leader and was succeeded by Proinsias De Rossa. He served as Lord Mayor of Dublin from 1993 to 1994, the first Workers' Party councillor to serve as Lord Mayor, and remained a member of Dublin Corporation until 1998.

While president he was regarded as a mediator between the Marxist-Leninist wing headed by Seán Garland and the social democratic wing of Proinsias De Rossa. At the 1992 special Ardfheis he voted for the motion to abandon democratic centralism and to re-constitute the party much as the Italian Communist Party became the Democratic Party of the Left. However the motion failed to reach the required two-thirds majority and after the departure of six Workers' Party TDs led by De Rossa to form the new Democratic Left party in 1992, Mac Giolla was the sole member of the Workers' Party in the Dáil. He lost his Dáil seat at the general election later that year by a margin of just 59 votes to Liam Lawlor of Fianna Fáil. In 1999, Mac Giolla wrote to the chairman of the Flood Tribunal calling for an investigation into revelations that former Dublin Assistant City and County Manager George Redmond had been the official supervisor at the election count in Dublin West and was a close associate of Liam Lawlor. In 2003, Redmond was convicted of corruption by a Dublin court but subsequently had his conviction quashed due to conflicting evidence.

In his eighties Mac Giolla continued to be active and was a member of the group which campaigned to prevent the demolition of No. 16 Moore Street in Dublin city centre, where the surrender after the Easter Rising was completed. He also served on the Dublin '98 committee to commemorate the 200th anniversary of the 1798 Rebellion.

He died in Beaumont Hospital in Dublin on 4 February 2010 after a long illness.

Publications
 The Great Irish Oil & Gas Robbery  (1974). .

References

1924 births
2010 deaths
Irish communists
Irish Republican Army (1922–1969) members
Irish republicans
Irish republicans interned without trial
Irish socialists
Leaders of Sinn Féin
Lord Mayors of Dublin
Members of the 24th Dáil
Members of the 25th Dáil
Members of the 26th Dáil
Official Irish Republican Army members
People educated at St Flannan's College
People from Nenagh
Politicians from County Tipperary
Republicans imprisoned during the Northern Ireland conflict
Workers' Party (Ireland) TDs